Cricket at the 2019 South Asian Games was held in Twenty20 format in Kirtipur and Pokhara, Nepal between 2 and 9 December 2019. Cricket returned to the South Asian Games after a period of nine years. The men's tournament featured under-23 squads from Bangladesh and Sri Lanka and senior squads from Bhutan, Maldives and Nepal. The women's event featured teams from  Bangladesh, Sri Lanka, Maldives and Nepal. All matches in the men's event were played at the Tribhuvan University International Cricket Ground in Kirtipur. The women's event was played at the Pokhara Stadium.

Medal summary

Medal table

Results

Participating teams

Men:
 
 
 
 
 

Women:

References

External links
 Men's tournament at ESPN Cricinfo
 Women's tournament at ESPN Cricinfo

2019 South Asian Games
Cricket at the South Asian Games
Events at the 2019 South Asian Games
South Asian Games